Walincourt-Selvigny is a commune in the Nord department in northern France. It was formed in 1973 by the merger of the former communes Walincourt and Selvigny.

Population

See also
Communes of the Nord department

References

Walincourtselvigny